The mottled berryhunter or mottled whistler (Rhagologus leucostigma) is a species of bird whose relationships are unclear but is most likely related to the woodswallows, boatbills and butcherbirds. It is monotypic within the genus Rhagologus and family Rhagologidae.
It is found in the highlands of New Guinea, where its natural habitat is subtropical or tropical moist montane forests.

References

 del Hoyo, J.; Elliot, A. & Christie D. (editors). (2007). Handbook of the Birds of the World. Volume 12: Picathartes to Tits and Chickadees. Lynx Edicions. 

mottled berryhunter
Birds of New Guinea
mottled berryhunter
Taxonomy articles created by Polbot